The 1763 Komárom earthquake occurred in or near the town of  Komárom in Komárom County in the Kingdom of Hungary on 28 June between 5 and 6 in the morning. The earthquake has been estimated at 6.2 to 6.5 on the moment magnitude scale.

Background

The Komárom earthquake was an intraplate earthquake in the Pannonian Basin associated with the Rába-Hurbanovo tectonic line. Earthquakes in the region are caused by deformation resulting from the movement of the Adriatic Plate relative to the Eurasian Plate. The 1763 earthquake accounts for about 80% of all the seismic moment released in the Komárom area since 1599. Due to the lack of seismologic instruments in 1763, the mechanism of and depth of the earthquake is not known, though most earthquakes in the region occur in the upper 20 km of crust.

Casualties and damage

The earthquake killed 83 people and 102 people were wounded. Damage in Komárom was extensive – contemporary reports note that the newly constructed Jesuit church and college were heavily damaged, including the collapse of two towers which killed several people. According to reports, 102 people were wounded and 7 churches, 279 dwelling fully and 353 partially collapsed. Other reports indicate that soil liquefaction occurred due to the earthquake.

See also
 Geology of the Western Carpathians
 1956 Budapest earthquake
 List of historical earthquakes

References 

1763 earthquakes
18th century in Hungary
1763 in the Habsburg monarchy
Earthquakes_in_Hungary